No Compromise was a San Francisco, California, United States-based bi-annual animal rights magazine, first published in the winter of 1989. The magazine covered global aspects of animal rights and promoted a vegan lifestyle, which included the use of cruelty-free products.

The magazine was founded by Freeman Wicklund and stopped publishing in 2005 with the 29th issue. Later it was a website for news links about grassroots direct action, militant animal liberationists, their supporters and the Animal Liberation Front (ALF). It is no longer active.

See also
Bite Back
Arkangel Magazine
 List of animal rights groups

Notes

External links
No Compromise magazine on Talon Conspiracy website
No Compromise magazine

Animal Liberation Front
Biannual magazines published in the United States
Defunct political magazines published in the United States
Independent magazines
Magazines about animal rights
Magazines established in 1989
Magazines disestablished in 2005
Magazines published in San Francisco
Online magazines published in the United States
Online magazines with defunct print editions
Vegetarian publications and websites